The Țolici is a right tributary of the river Topolița in Romania. It flows into the Topolița in Târpești.

References

Rivers of Romania
Rivers of Neamț County